Indrani is a feminine Indian name. Indrani is the name of Shachi, wife of Hindu God Indra.

List of persons with the given name

Indrani Haldar (born 1971), Indian actress
Indrani Sen, Bengali singer
Indrani Mukherjee, Indian actress
Indrani (photographer) Indrani Pal-Chaudhuri, director, photographer, social justice advocate, Canadian-British-Indian.
Indrani Pal-Chaudhuri, director, photographer, social justice advocate, Canadian-British-Indian.
Indrani Rahman (1930–1999), Indian dancer
Indrani Dutta (born 1970), Indian actress
Indrani Mukerjea (born 1972), INX Media CEO
Indrani Paul (born 2000), Indian actress and model
Indrani of Sambhupura

List of people with the surname
 Seeta Indrani (born 1963) British actress and dancer

Indian feminine given names